Guadalupia is an extinct genus of sea sponges. It includes a number of extinct species including: Guadalupia auricula, G. cupulosa, G. ramescens, G. microcamera, and G. vasa.

Fossils of Guadalupia zitteliana Girty, 1908a and Guadalupia explanata (King, 1943) have been found in the Upper Permian limestone near the Carlsbad Caverns in New Mexico.

References

Animals described in 1908
Agelasida
Pennsylvanian genus first appearances
Gzhelian genera
Asselian genera
Sakmarian genera
Artinskian genera
Kungurian genera
Roadian genera
Wordian genera
Capitanian genera
Wuchiapingian genera
Changhsingian genera
Induan genera
Olenekian genera
Anisian genera
Ladinian genera
Carnian genera
Norian genus extinctions